The Los Angeles Clippers are an American professional basketball team based in Los Angeles. The Clippers compete in the National Basketball Association (NBA) as a member of the Pacific Division in the league's Western Conference. The Clippers play their home games at Crypto.com Arena, which they share with NBA team Los Angeles Lakers, the Los Angeles Sparks of the Women's National Basketball Association (WNBA), and the Los Angeles Kings of the National Hockey League (NHL). The Clippers plan to move into their own arena, the Intuit Dome, in nearby Inglewood by 2024.

The franchise was founded as the Buffalo Braves in 1970 as an expansion team. Led by Hall of Famer Bob McAdoo, the Braves reached the NBA playoffs three times during their eight seasons in Buffalo. Conflicts with the Canisius Golden Griffins over the Buffalo Memorial Auditorium and the sale of the franchise led to their relocation from Buffalo to San Diego, California in 1978 and subsequent rebranding as the San Diego Clippers, in reference to the sailing ships seen in San Diego Bay. The team saw little success on the court and missed the playoffs during all six of their years in San Diego.

In 1984, owner Donald Sterling controversially relocated the franchise to Los Angeles without NBA approval, which was permitted following legal action between the league and Sterling. Over the course of their first 27 seasons in Los Angeles, the Clippers qualified for the postseason only four times and won a single playoff round. They were frequently considered a perennial loser in American professional sports, drawing unfavorable comparisons to the historically successful Lakers.

The Clippers' reputation improved during the 2010s, which saw them transform into consistent postseason contenders. Aided by the "Lob City" lineup of Blake Griffin, DeAndre Jordan, and Chris Paul, the team qualified for the playoffs in six consecutive seasons from 2012 to 2017 and won two consecutive division titles in 2013 and 2014, both firsts for the franchise. Despite this success, the Clippers struggled in the postseason and were frequently eliminated in the Conference Semifinals; the team reached the Conference Finals for the first time in 2021. To date, they are the league's oldest franchise to have never played in the NBA Finals.

Franchise history

1970–1978: Buffalo Braves

The franchise began in Western New York as the Buffalo Braves, one of three NBA expansion franchises that began play in the 1970–71 season, along with the Portland Trail Blazers and Cleveland Cavaliers. They played their home games at the Buffalo Memorial Auditorium, along with another Buffalo team that would begin play that year, the National Hockey League's Buffalo Sabres.

After two bad seasons, the Braves' fortunes started to change under coach Jack Ramsay and star forward/center Bob McAdoo. McAdoo led the NBA in scoring for three consecutive seasons and was named the league's MVP in the 1974–75 season. The Braves qualified for the playoffs three times in a row, losing twice to the eventual Eastern Conference champions (the Boston Celtics in 1974 and 1976, and the Washington Bullets in 1975). Despite the team's modest success in Buffalo, Braves owner Paul Snyder and the league found it impossible to schedule home games at the auditorium because of the Canisius Golden Griffins men's basketball team, which had a pre-existing lease on the arena and priority on game dates over the Braves, with the next best dates in turn taken by the much more successful Sabres. At a time where the NBA was nearing a nadir and the league did not have its current prestige, the Griffins saw the Braves as a threat to their own success, and purposely scheduled all the best dates at the arena to prevent the Braves from succeeding. As a result, after a failed attempt to sell the team to an owner who intended to move it to South Florida, Snyder sold the team to Kentucky Colonels owner John Y. Brown, Jr., who decimated the team's roster, traded away all of its stars, and drove attendance down to the point where they could break their own lease on the arena. Eventually, Brown met with Celtics owner Irv Levin in 1978 so they could trade franchise ownerships. Southern California resident Levin then decided to move the Braves to San Diego, something the league would have never allowed him to do with the Celtics. Asked about the move, Levin nominated a shorter commute for himself as a key reason.

1978–1984: San Diego Clippers
In 1978, San Diego welcomed the relocation of the Buffalo Braves franchise, as the city's previous NBA franchise, the San Diego Rockets, had relocated to Houston seven years earlier in 1971. Another failed basketball franchise in the city had been the San Diego Conquistadors. San Diego team officials did not think "Braves" was a proper representative nickname for the club in San Diego, and a local naming contest ultimately decided on "Clippers", in reference to the city being known for the great sailing ships that passed through San Diego Bay. The first head coach of the Clippers was chosen to be Gene Shue, a respected tactician. He preferred a fast playing style with many scoring opportunities. Only three players from the Braves started in the team: Randy Smith, Swen Nater, and Scott Lloyd. Other starting players included Kermit Washington, and Sidney Wicks. World B. Free was also brought in, in exchange for a future first round pick for the Philadelphia 76ers.

The 1978–79 season started off poorly, with the Clippers' first win only on the fourth game against the Chicago Bulls. The team lost 12 of its 18 first games and dropped to the bottom of the Pacific Division. Player Kevin Kunnert argued they had the "killer instinct of a field mouse". The worst loss came against the San Antonio Spurs, with a loss of 163 to 125. Nevertheless, within weeks, Free had become the leading scorer, as well as becoming a public icon. He finished second overall in NBA scoring average, with 28.9 per game (George Gervin of the San Antonio Spurs had a 29.6 average). Shue, meanwhile, tried to create a team spirit by creating a common social life. By the annual break for the All-Star game, however, the Clippers had improved, winning half of their 54 games, leading to a sixth ranking in the Western Conference. Aiming for one of the six play-off spots for the Conference, they managed to win eight games in a row, and then another five games consecutively. Playing at the San Diego Sports Arena, the Clippers posted a record of 43–39 in their first season in California under, leaving them two wins shy of the final playoff spot. It was also the first season in Southern California for long-time announcer Ralph Lawler began his association with the franchise.

The 1979–80 season saw the Clippers begin to struggle, despite adding center Bill Walton, a San Diego native who was two years removed from winning an NBA Championship and the NBA Most Valuable Player Award with the Portland Trail Blazers. Walton missed 68 games in his first season in San Diego due to foot injuries (which he also suffered in his final years in Portland). San Diego finished 35–47, as Walton and other key players missed significant time due to injuries. Free again finished second in league scoring, with 30.2 points per game. Paul Silas replaced Shue as head coach the following season, and the Clippers finished 36–46, again missing the postseason. Walton missed the entire season due to foot injuries, while Free was traded to the Golden State Warriors in exchange for guard Phil Smith.

The 1981–82 season brought ultimately unwelcome changes to the franchise as Levin sold the team to Los Angeles-area real estate developer and attorney Donald Sterling for $12.5 million. The Clippers experienced poor play, as foot injuries again caused Walton to miss the entire season, and the team limped to a 17–65 record. Rumors of a move to Sterling's hometown of Los Angeles and franchise mismanagement plagued the team immediately from the onset of Sterling's acquisition. On one occasion, Sterling was fined $10,000 by the NBA, the largest sum ever levied by the NBA against an owner at the time, for publicly guaranteeing the Clippers would lose enough games to contend for a high enough draft pick to select Ralph Sampson. On another, he was fined for flying his players to away games in coach seats on commercial airliners, a violation of the league's collective bargaining agreement. Hotels refused to house the Clippers because of alleged non-payment for previous accommodations on multiple occasions. A bus company in Newark once stranded the team at the airport after Sterling failed to pay for previous trips, which nearly caused the team to miss a scheduled regular-season game that day against the New Jersey Nets.

Sterling attempted to relocate the franchise to Los Angeles in June 1982 but the NBA denied his request. Sterling then filed an unsuccessful antitrust lawsuit against the league, which subsequently filed a countersuit against the club and the Los Angeles Memorial Sports Arena, which Sterling had a tentative agreement with to become the franchise's new home. The attempted move, combined with the franchise mismanagement issues, prompted an investigation of the Clippers by an NBA committee of other owners. In September of that year, the committee recommended that Sterling's ownership be terminated, having found that he was late in paying creditors and players. Days before a league scheduled vote in October to remove Sterling, he agreed to sell the team, and the league sought buyers who would keep the franchise in San Diego. At the suggestion of David Stern, then the league's vice president, Sterling was able to maintain his position as owner, by instead handing over operations duties of the franchise to Alan Rothenberg, who became the team's president. By February 1983, Stern called the Clippers a "first-class" franchise, and the ouster of Sterling was no longer pursued. Later in 1983, Larry Fleisher, then the general counsel of the National Basketball Players Association, stated ''in all my years of involvement with the NBA, no team ever provided as much difficulties for the players than the Clippers under Sterling." "He almost caused three strikes last season.'' The team's final two seasons in San Diego were not much better on the court despite Walton finally returning to the court, finishing 25–57 in 1982–83 and 30–52 in 1983–84.

In 1984, Sterling, despite again being denied permission from the NBA to do so, moved the Clippers north to Los Angeles. The NBA subsequently fined Sterling $25 million for violating league rules and filed a lawsuit demanding the franchise be returned to San Diego. The league threatened to dissolve the franchise if ownership did not comply and return the team to San Diego. Sterling then filed another antitrust lawsuit against the league (for $100 million). This time, thanks to the court decision that allowed Al Davis to move the Oakland Raiders of the National Football League (NFL) to Los Angeles, it appeared Sterling would win his case. The league soon agreed to drop their lawsuit in exchange for Sterling dropping his case, allowing him to keep the team in Los Angeles and decreasing his fine to $6 million.

1984–1989: Move to Los Angeles, and early struggles

In 1984, despite the pending lawsuits between franchise ownership and the NBA following the move, the Clippers began play at the Los Angeles Memorial Sports Arena. The Clippers finished their first season in Los Angeles 31–51 under head coach Jim Lynam.

The Clippers' early days in Los Angeles were marred with many seasons of hapless performances. Despite fielding a squad of talented veterans, the organization suffered systematic injuries to many of its star players. The phenomenon was dubbed the "Clipper Triangle" by some sports writers. Derek Smith suffered a knee injury during the 1985–86 season, followed by Norm Nixon (knee) and Marques Johnson (spinal cord) the following season. The team's 12–70 finish in the 1987 season was the second-worst single-season record in NBA history at the time (and is now the third-worst winning percentage in NBA history, behind the 1973 Philadelphia 76ers and the 2012 Charlotte Bobcats). That same season also saw Hall of Famer Elgin Baylor join the team as the general manager and vice president of basketball operations. Nixon suffered an ailing Achilles tendon in 1987–88 season, while number one draft pick rookie Danny Manning injured his anterior cruciate ligament during the 1988–89 campaign.

1989–1994: Playoff appearances

The Clippers traded the rights to the recently drafted Danny Ferry and Reggie Williams for high-scoring shooting guard Ron Harper at the start of the 1989–90 season. Los Angeles had a 19–19 record nearly halfway into the season, prompting some to seriously consider the team as a possible playoff contender. That move, along with the 1987 NBA draft of Ken Norman, the 1988 selections of Danny Manning and Charles Smith (Smith was acquired from Philadelphia in exchange for the draft rights to Hersey Hawkins), and the 1990 draft of Loy Vaught, formed a nucleus that would make the franchise a playoff contender.

Midway through the 1991–92 season, the Clippers made yet another coaching change. Larry Brown, recently fired by the San Antonio Spurs, was hired as the team's head coach in late January 1992. He replaced Mike Schuler, who had led the team to a 22–25 record before his firing. Brown finished the season with a 23–12 mark, for a 45–37 overall—the franchise's first winning season in 13 years. For the first time since moving to Los Angeles, they finished with a better record than the crosstown Los Angeles Lakers. The Clippers advanced to the playoffs for the first time in 16 years (since the franchise's Buffalo heyday), but were eliminated in the first round of the playoffs by the Utah Jazz, 3–2. Due to the late April 1992 Los Angeles riots, the Anaheim Convention Center was the site of Game 4 of the series, which the Clippers won. The team made the playoffs again in the 1992–93 season with a 41–41 record, but lost again in five games in the first round, this time to the Rockets.

Brown left to become the Indiana Pacers' head coach after the season and Bob Weiss was brought in to replace him. That 1993–94 season proved to be one of the worst in Los Angeles history, with the Clippers and Lakers going a combined 60–104. In February 1994, the Clippers traded Manning to the Atlanta Hawks for Dominique Wilkins. Wilkins played 25 games for the club, averaging 29.1 points, 7.0 rebounds, and 2.2 assists in 37.9 minutes per game. After one year on the job, Weiss was fired, Wilkins left in free agency, and veteran head coach Bill Fitch was brought in to guide a new roster of young and inexperienced players.

1994–2000: Fitch, Anaheim and the move to Staples Center

Anaheim relocation talks
The city, expecting to lose the NFL's Los Angeles Rams (who relocated to St. Louis in 1995 for 21 seasons, before moving back to Los Angeles in 2016), was looking for a new professional team and began courting the Clippers, who struggled to carve out an identity competing against the popular Lakers for audience share. From 1994 to 1999, the Clippers played several games annually (usually five to eight regular-season games a season, and an annual preseason game) at the Arrowhead Pond of Anaheim, sharing the venue with the NHL's Ducks and the Splash indoor soccer team. Clippers games regularly drew a much-higher average attendance per game at the Pond than when the team played its home games at their regular venue, the Los Angeles Sports Arena; the Anaheim games proved so popular that many Clippers players and much of the fan base, as well as the NBA, wanted to the team to stay in what was considered at the time a state-of-the-art arena. For instance, between 1994 and 1997, the Clippers drew an average of nearly 16,000 fans per game at the Pond, while in Los Angeles, they drew in the neighborhood of 9,200 per home game. Anaheim officials and the Clippers had had on-going talks about moving to Anaheim full-time years before the Pond was eventually built, as Donald Sterling was pursuing options to play elsewhere in the Los Angeles metropolitan region if there was not a replacement for the Sports Arena being built.

The Clippers, however, nearly moved to Anaheim permanently in time for the 1996–97 season, but according to a Los Angeles Times article published in June 1996, owner Donald Sterling turned down a deal that would have paid the team $95 million over 12 years. Odgen Corporation, who at the time managed the Pond, and the city of Anaheim offered the Clippers a multi-tiered deal that would have included upwards of $33 million paid to the team over the first six years of their Pond agreement, plus other monies allocated towards new locker rooms, team offices, and a practice facility. In another related Times article, Odgen and Sterling were in talks to have the management company take care of the Clippers' day-to-day operations for a $4 million a year fee. Also at the time, the Walt Disney Company, owners of the Ducks and Anaheim Angels baseball team during that period, were pursuing at least a partial ownership of the Clippers, with the key element being that its game telecasts would be part of a planned ESPN regional network for Southern California. However, as the planned ESPN West network never came to reality, all three teams had continued to maintain broadcast partnerships with Fox Sports West and Prime Ticket. This remained a sticking point in any deal to relocate to Anaheim, eventually leaving the team to remain in Los Angeles.

Bill Fitch era
On the court, the Clippers continued to make frequent roster changes throughout this particular period, which only resulted in one playoff appearance under Fitch. Along with Loy Vaught, a collection of young players (including Lamond Murray, Eric Piatkowski, and Lorenzen Wright), and journeyman veterans (among them Pooh Richardson, Tony Massenburg, Rodney Rogers, Darrick Martin, and Brian Williams), the Fitch-coached teams during this particular era struggled mightily, although they did make the playoffs once during this time. The 1996–97 team made the playoffs with a losing record (36–46) and were swept in the first round by the eventual Western Conference champions, the Utah Jazz, three games to none.

Four members of the 1996–97 squad are now deceased. Malik Sealy died in a car accident in 2000, Kevin Duckworth died of heart disease in 2008, Lorenzen Wright went missing and was murdered in 2010, and Dwayne Schintzius died from cancer complications in 2012. Two other players from the Fitch era suffered tragic circumstances of their own; Brian Williams (who played for the Clippers during the 1995–96 season, and later became known as Bison Dele) was believed to have been murdered by his brother while the two were vacationing in 2002 while in the South Pacific, and Rodney Rogers became paralyzed after a dirt bike crash in 2008 in his native North Carolina.

In December, Vaught, the team's leading scorer for the past three seasons, had season-ending back surgery. Without Vaught, the Clippers finished 17–65, the third-worst record in the league. Fitch was fired after the 1997–98 season (and later sued the team to recover the remaining money on his contract), and was replaced by one of his proteges, former Celtics and Bucks coach Chris Ford. Meanwhile, Vaught's career as a Clipper was effectively finished, as he left as a free agent after that season, and signed with the Detroit Pistons; at the time of his departure, he was the franchise's all-time rebounds leader with 4,471 (a number that was later surpassed by Elton Brand, with 4,710).

The Clippers won the first overall pick in the 1998 Draft Lottery and selected center Michael Olowokandi from University of the Pacific. The team had a 0–17 start and finished with a 9–41 record in the lockout-shortened 1998–99 season. They were led by second-year forward Maurice Taylor, who averaged 16.8 points per game, and won the fourth overall pick in the following draft, which coincided with their move to the Staples Center. The Clippers would draft Lamar Odom, and then hired former All-Star (and Los Angeles native) Dennis Johnson as an assistant coach, as well as Hall of Fame former Laker great Kareem Abdul-Jabbar to help tutor Olowokandi during his second-year. Johnson remained an assistant coach until the middle of the 2002–03 season, when he took over as head coach. Abdul-Jabbar remained only one season, detailing a lack of improvement in Olowokandi, who is largely considered one of the biggest draft busts in league history.

During the 1999 off-season, Rodney Rogers signed with the Phoenix Suns. The Clippers also sent Lamond Murray to the Cleveland Cavaliers for Derek Anderson and Johnny Newman. However, Newman was then traded to the New Jersey Nets for Eric Murdock a month later without ever playing a game for the Clippers. The team finished with the worst record in the league (15–67) in the 1999–2000 season, while the Lakers had the best record that year (67–15), and won the NBA championship.

Move to Staples Center
In what was supposed to be a counter-move, the Coliseum Commission, the management entity that managed the Los Angeles Memorial Sports Arena and Coliseum, had planned to build a new 18,700-seat arena in the parking lot next to the Sports Arena that would have cost up to $94 million, that would have included 1,100 club seats, 84 luxury suites, and an on-site practice facility for the Clippers. However, those plans were scuttled once planning for Staples Center (two miles directly up the street from the Sports Arena) were taking place, and the Clippers decided to become a tenant at Staples.

In 1999, the Clippers joined the Lakers and Los Angeles Kings in the new Staples Center in Downtown Los Angeles. In sharing the building with other tenants, such as the more popular Lakers, the Clippers, with relatively low success, were often overshadowed. Also, because of the terms of its leasing agreement with Staples Center, the Kings and Lakers had scheduling priority over the Clippers, with the Clippers taking whatever dates that were available, including scheduling same-day Clipper-Laker and Clipper-King doubleheaders. However, in the years after, the Clippers' scheduling at Staples Center became gradually more favorable (especially given the popularity of the team in recent years) in their lease renewals in 2004 and 2013, with the team receiving increased profits, including more of a share of luxury suite and concession revenue. Since February 2011, the Clippers have sold out every regular season and postseason home game, behind the popularity of stars Blake Griffin, DeAndre Jordan, and Chris Paul.

2000–2009: Further struggles at Staples Center
The 2000–01 season brought changes. Derek Strong was sent to the Orlando Magic in exchange for Corey Maggette and the draft rights to Keyon Dooling. The Clippers' two draft picks that year were childhood friends from Illinois: high schooler Darius Miles (3rd overall pick) and Quentin Richardson (18th overall pick). The team became popular among fans with its high-flying style of basketball and the Clippers did improve slightly, registering a 31–51 record. The team also lead the NBA in bench-scoring, with 37 points per game.

To improve upon the previous season, the Clippers acquired high-scoring and rebounding power forward Elton Brand from the Chicago Bulls in exchange for the draft rights to Tyson Chandler. Brand earned a spot on the 2002 NBA Western Conference All-Star team as an injury replacement for Shaquille O'Neal. The Clippers contended for most of the season, but won only 3 of the last 12 games and finished 39–43, five games out of the playoffs. In order to seriously challenge for playoff contention in 2003, the franchise traded Miles to the Cavaliers for Andre Miller, who led the NBA in assists in 2001–02 with 11 per game. With a seasoned point guard in Miller, Lamar Odom at small forward, one of the league's best power forwards in Brand, and center Olowokandi, as well as having the best supporting cast in the league, the Clippers threatened a potential playoff run. However, poor team chemistry and injuries (the Clippers lost 293 man-games to injury), they finished with a disappointing 27–55 record. Coach Alvin Gentry was also replaced, with Dennis Johnson entering midway through the 2002–03 season.

After the dismal season prior, the team lost several of its core players, with Miller, Odom, Olowakandi, and forward Eric Piatkowski (who was one of the longest-tenured players in franchise history) departing via free agency prior to the 2003–04 season. The team opted to retain Brand and Maggette with long-term contracts. They, along with Richardson, made up one of the NBA's best high-scoring trios, with a combined 58 points per game. With new head coach Mike Dunleavy, Sr., they finished 28–54, due to inexperience and injuries. The following season again saw the team missing the playoffs, although, they posted a better record than the Lakers for the first time since 1993. Bobby Simmons, a former second-round pick, won the 2004–05 NBA Most Improved Player award after averaging 16 points, 6 rebounds, and 3 assists per game. As a result, Simmons signed a 5-year, $47 million deal with the Milwaukee Bucks. To counter Simmons' defection, the Clippers announced they would sign Cuttino Mobley. Mobley's contract was identical in length, but for five million less than Simmons', and marked the first significant free-agent signing from outside the organization since Walton in the late 1970s. The Clippers also completed the building of a practice facility (the first NBA practice facility within the four corners of the City of Los Angeles) in the Playa Vista development. Midway through the season, the Clippers traded Marko Jarić (in a sign and trade transaction) and Lionel Chalmers to the Minnesota Timberwolves in exchange for Sam Cassell and a lottery-protected first round pick in the 2006 NBA draft.

The 2005–06 season was a turning point for the team's image; marked by several wins over top teams, Brand's performances were greatly praised, and he was chosen for the All-Star Game. Many sports writers noted the team's improvement, especially after acquiring sharpshooter Vladimir Radmanović from the Seattle SuperSonics in exchange for big-man Chris Wilcox. While the team had a few stretches of poor play, they were able to maintain a solid record, including posting several winning streaks. They achieved their first winning record in 14 seasons, and clinched their first playoff spot since 1997. They also finished with a better record than the Lakers for the second straight year. By finishing sixth in the Western Conference, with a record of 47–35 (their highest finish since the team left Buffalo), they benefited from the current NBA playoff format of regular-season records taking precedence over winning the division, and secured home court advantage over the Denver Nuggets.

On April 22, 2006, the Clippers won their first NBA playoff game in 13 years. Two days later, they won their second playoff game, going 2–0 against an opponent for the first time in franchise history. They lost Game 3, won Game 4, and on May 1, they won Game 5 in Los Angeles. This would mark their first playoff series win since they moved from Buffalo. In the next round, the team faced the Phoenix Suns. After losing a close Game 1, they won Game 2, 122–97. The series shifted to Staples Center for Game 3, but the Suns won, 94–91. In Game 4, Brand posted 30 points, nine rebounds, and eight assists as the Clippers evened the series. In Game 5, Raja Bell made a key 3-pointer for the Suns with 1.1 seconds left in the first overtime to send the game into a second overtime. However, Phoenix won in double-overtime, 125–118. They bounced back with a series-saving 118–106 Game 6 win. Second-year defensive specialist Quinton Ross had a timely offensive game, scoring a then career-high 18 points. Brand had 30 points (his scoring average in this series), 12 rebounds, and five blocks. Corey Maggette came off the bench to score 25 points, with 7–8 shooting from the field, and 9–9 from the free-throw line. Kaman and Cassell each scored 15 points. However, the Clippers lost the seventh game, 127–107. General Manager (and Naismith Memorial Basketball Hall of Fame member) Elgin Baylor won the NBA Executive of the Year award for leading the Clippers' playoff run.

The 2006 off-season started as the team drafted Paul Davis in the second round of the 2006 NBA draft, as the 34th overall pick. The pick was acquired by the Clippers by way of a 2004 trade for Melvin Ely. The team also drafted Guillermo Diaz as the 52nd overall pick. While Davis signed with the team, Diaz decided to play overseas. However, the team still holds his draft rights. Meanwhile, in free agency, they signed Tim Thomas away from divisional Phoenix, in a four-year, $24 million deal. That was to counter the defection of Vladimir Radmanović to the Lakers in a similar deal. Radmanovic's contract lasted another year, but both players would make the same amount of money annually, which would be $6 million. Cassell (widely credited as the biggest reason for the Clippers' recent success) re-signed on a two-year, $13 million deal, while the team also signed veteran Aaron Williams to an undisclosed deal.

In September, the Clippers also announced a radio broadcast deal with KSPN-AM, the local ESPN Radio-operated outlet. Despite several additions, the team did not perform to expectations, with a lack of team chemistry and injuries to several key players, including Cassell, Thomas, and Kaman, forcing the team to sign journeymen Luke Jackson, Alvin Williams, and Doug Christie to help solidify the team's bench. The season disappointment extended as Shaun Livingston suffered a dislocated left knee in which he tore every ligament in his knee. This was one of the most devastating injuries that season, and considered one of the worst in league history. The extent of the injury was so severe, local news outlets such as KCBS-TV/KCAL-TV and KNBC-TV elected not to air the clip of the injury. According to the team's lead physician, Dr. Tony Daly, Livingston's prognosis for him to return to basketball activity was eight months (which was around the first week of the upcoming season) to a full calendar year. The Clippers finished the season 40–42, two games behind the eighth-seed, while the Lakers finished with a better record for the first time since the 2003–04 season. The Clippers received the 14th draft pick from the NBA lottery in the 2007 NBA Draft, selecting Al Thornton.

The 2007–08 season started off negatively, with Brand rupturing his left Achilles tendon. Brand missed most of the season, and the team struggled to stay competitive. Chris Kaman took advantage of a depleted roster by averaging 15.7 points and 12.7 rebounds per game, but was limited to playing 56 games, also due to various injuries. The Clippers ended the season 23–59, and the team aimed to rebuild for the following season. Both Brand and Maggette were allowed to depart, while ten players were acquired. Brand stated his desire to stay, but the contract faltered, allowing him to move to the Philadelphia 76ers. Baron Davis, a Los Angeles native and formerly of the Golden State Warriors, signed a five-year contract with the Clippers, worth an estimated $65 million. In the upcoming draft, the Clippers obtained the seventh pick, and selected Eric Gordon. They also selected DeAndre Jordan, who was picked 35th overall. Mike Taylor, the 55th overall pick, was acquired from the Portland Trail Blazers in exchange for a future second-round pick.

In July 2008, they acquired Marcus Camby from the Denver Nuggets in return for a $10 million trade exception and the choice to exchange second round picks with the Clippers in 2010. The Clippers also acquired guard Jason Hart from the Utah Jazz, in exchange for guard Brevin Knight, and signed Ricky Davis to a one-year deal. They continued an active off-season by re-signing former Clippers player Brian Skinner in July, while trading for Steve Novak. The team would also sign Jason Williams to a one-year deal. However, just prior to the start of training camp in September, Williams announced his retirement. Other mid-season acquisitions came in the form of Zach Randolph and Mardy Collins, who arrived from the New York Knicks in exchange for Tim Thomas and Cuttino Mobley. This trade made Kaman the sole member still on the team from their playoff run two years prior.

In October 2008, Baylor ended his 22-year reign as vice president and general manager of basketball operations. It remains one of the longest tenures in professional sports history. The Clippers indicated that Baylor had retired from his post, and as a result, head coach Mike Dunleavy, Sr. assumed the role of General Manager, while director of player personnel Neil Olshey was promoted to assistant general manager. However, several other reports indicated Baylor had been fired or resigned, and when questioned, Baylor responded he had been advised by his attorneys not to comment on the matter. This prompted speculation that the team and Baylor were in negotiations to work out a settlement agreement for his departure, with Baylor reportedly working without a formal contract since the early 1990s.

The 2008–09 season ended with the team 14th in the Western Conference, with a record of 19–63. They were then awarded the first overall pick in the 2009 NBA draft.

2009–2011: The arrival of Blake Griffin and steady improvement
With the first overall pick, the team selected Blake Griffin. To clear a spot in the lineup for him, they traded Zach Randolph to Memphis for Quentin Richardson. Richardson was then traded to the Minnesota Timberwolves for Sebastian Telfair, Craig Smith, and Mark Madsen.

Griffin immediately impressed in training camp and preseason. On October 23, he broke his kneecap during the Clippers' final exhibition game against the New Orleans Hornets, following a dunk. Initially, the Clippers' stated that he only had a sore left knee, which would make him questionable for the season opener the following night, before they revealed the break. The injury sidelined Griffin for the entire season.

On February 4, 2010, head coach Mike Dunleavy resigned, and Kim Hughes was named interim coach. Dunleavy retained his front-office title and duties for just over a month, but on March 10 he was fired as General Manager, being replaced by Neil Olshey. Dunleavy received the news of his dismissal from the internet, as well as friends and reporters calling his cell phone. The Los Angeles Times reported that Dunleavy had filed for arbitration and that the Clippers had cut off his salary, even though his guaranteed contract did not end until after the 2010–11 season. Although the Clippers saw minor improvement, finishing with ten more wins at 29–53, Hughes was fired as head coach at the end of the season.

In July, former Chicago Bulls coach Vinny Del Negro was hired as the next head coach. In August, the team introduced new uniform designs at a photoshoot, at the team's practice facility. Griffin and DeAndre Jordan, who saw significant improvement in his two years with the team, modeled the new uniforms, which were re-designed for the first time since the 2000–01 season. The Clippers' primary and secondary logos, which are modifications of the previous ones, were introduced to the public weeks earlier, on the night of the 2010 NBA draft, where the Clippers selected Al-Farouq Aminu eighth overall.

With an improved Gordon, stalwart Kaman, rookie Aminu, starting center Jordan, a re-energized Baron Davis, and the debut of Griffin, the Clippers had high hopes for the season. However, they started slowly, losing ten of the first 11 games, with Davis and Kaman out with injuries. However, the Clippers showed strength when three of their first four wins came from the top teams in the Western Conference. Griffin got off to a strong start, drawing increased media attention in Clippers games and boosting ratings of local broadcasts of Clippers games. Griffin was chosen as a Western Conference Reserve in the 2011 NBA All-Star Game, a rare honor for a rookie, the first chosen by the coaches for the game since Tim Duncan in 1997. He also won the NBA Sprite Slam Dunk Contest, and was named the Rookie of the Year as the team finished with a record of 32–50. As the trade deadline approached, the Clippers sent Baron Davis along with their 2011 first-round draft pick to the Cleveland Cavaliers for Mo Williams and Jamario Moon. The pick eventually became the number one overall pick, which the Cavaliers used to select Kyrie Irving.

2011–2017: Arrival of Chris Paul and Lob City

In December 2011, the Clippers signed Caron Butler to a $24 million deal and claimed veteran point guard Chauncey Billups three days later. On December 14, they traded Eric Gordon, Chris Kaman, Al-Farouq Aminu and Minnesota's 2012 first-round pick acquired in 2005 for New Orleans Hornets' four-time all-star Chris Paul. Paul had previously almost been traded to the Los Angeles Lakers, but NBA commissioner David Stern had vetoed the trade (the NBA was owner of the Hornets at the time). Paul and Griffin were selected as starters for the Western Conference team in the 2012 NBA All-Star Game, the first time in franchise history the team had two All-Star starters in the same year.

The team gained the nickname "Lob City" due to a comment made by Griffin during the Clippers Media Day when the announcement of Chris Paul's trade reached the team. Griffin, after being told the news by Jordan, declared, "Yeah! It's going to be lob city!"

In February 2012, the Clippers signed Kenyon Martin. An 11-year NBA veteran and former NBA All-Star (2004), Martin joined the Clippers after signing with the Xinjiang Guanghui Flying Tigers of the Chinese Basketball Association the previous summer. On February 6, 2012, during a game against the Orlando Magic, Billups tore his Achilles tendon and missed the remainder of the season. In March 2012, Nick Young joined the Clippers as part of a three-team trade with the Washington Wizards and the Denver Nuggets. He became the eighth player to debut in the 2011–12 season.

After a stretch that saw the Clippers lose 12 of 19 games after Billups's season-ending injury, with rumors of Vinny Del Negro's career as head coach of the Clippers possibly coming to an abrupt end, Los Angeles went on a tear. The Clippers won 12 of their next 14 games, including road wins over the defending champions Dallas Mavericks and the Western Conference-leading Oklahoma City Thunder, clinching their fifth playoff berth since their 1976 conference semifinals loss to the Boston Celtics (the last time they made the playoffs as the Buffalo Braves) before a dominating home win over the Oklahoma City Thunder on April 16, 2012. It was their third win in four regular-season games against the Thunder. Chris Paul's push for the NBA Most Valuable Player Award was at its peak, and the 2011–12 season was the first time the Clippers were in the playoffs since 2005–06 season.

In their first playoff game, the Clippers rallied from a 27-point deficit against the Grizzlies to win 99–98 in one of the biggest rallies in playoff history. They led the series 3–1, then lost two straight, before coming back to win Game 7 in Memphis 82–72, becoming the sixth NBA road team to win Game 7 after leading series 3–1, and prevail to the second round. The Clippers relied on their bench during that game, and they came through, scoring all but two of their points in the fourth quarter. In the second round of the playoffs, the team was swept by the San Antonio Spurs. The following off-season, GM Neil Olshey reached an agreement to become General Manager of the Portland Trail Blazers. Olshey was replaced by Gary Sacks. On draft night, the team re-acquired Lamar Odom from the Dallas Mavericks as part of a four-team deal that also sent Mo Williams and Furkan Aldemir, their 2012 draftee, to the Utah Jazz and Houston Rockets, respectively. The team then sent Reggie Evans to the Brooklyn Nets for the right to swap second-round draft picks with the Nets in the 2016 NBA draft. On the same day, the Clippers signed free agent Jamal Crawford, formerly of the Portland Trail Blazers, and re-signed Billups to a one-year deal. The franchise then rounded out its roster for the upcoming season with Grant Hill, Ryan Hollins, and Ronny Turiaf, while signing Matt Barnes to a one-year deal early in the season.

On November 29, 2012, public address announcer David Courtney died in hospital, and was replaced by former Clippers and current Los Angeles Dodgers PA announcer, Eric Smith. On December 15, with a 111–85 victory over the Milwaukee Bucks, the Clippers recorded their record ninth consecutive win, breaking their previous franchise record (in Los Angeles) of eight wins set in the 1991–92 season. On December 21, with a 97–85 win over the Sacramento Kings, they notched their twelfth consecutive victory, breaking their previous 11-game streak as the Buffalo Braves in the 1974–75 season. On December 30, the Clippers recorded a team-record 17th straight win against the Utah Jazz, beating them 107–96. The win also made the Clippers the third team in NBA history to record an undefeated month ending the month of December 16–0. The streak ended when they lost to the Denver Nuggets on January 2, 2013.

On January 9, 2013, with a 99–93 victory over the Dallas Mavericks, the Clippers recorded another franchise record with their 13th straight home victory. On January 12, the Clippers 13 game home win streak came to an end with a 104–101 loss to the Orlando Magic. A 126–101 victory over the Phoenix Suns saw the Clippers reach the 50-win mark for the first time in franchise history, breaking their previous mark of 49 from 1974–75, when they were in Buffalo. On April 7, with a 109–95 victory over the Lakers, they swept the LA season series, and clinched their first division title in franchise history. They would finish the season with a 56–26 record, and entered the playoffs as the fourth seed, to once again face the fifth seeded Memphis Grizzlies. The Clippers would go up 2–0 early in the series after a buzzer beater by Chris Paul in game 2. After being up 2–0 in the series, the Clippers would lose 4 games in a row to be eliminated the first round. This caused the team to not renew Vinny Del Negro's contract as head coach, and acquired Doc Rivers from the Boston Celtics. The deal was announced to have included two future first-round draft picks, in addition to an anti-trade clause preventing the Clippers and Celtics from engaging in further transactions amongst each other, including the exchanging of players, for the duration of the 2013–14 season.

On July 3, 2013, the Clippers traded Eric Bledsoe and Caron Butler to the Phoenix Suns for Jared Dudley and JJ Redick (from the Milwaukee Bucks). The Clippers and Suns also sent a second-round pick each to the Bucks. On July 7, the team re-signed Barnes, Paul, and Ryan Hollins. Paul's deal was for 5 years, worth around $105.3 million. The team also signed Darren Collison to fill the back-up point guard role, replacing Bledsoe and free agent Chauncey Billups, who signed with the Detroit Pistons. On August 28, the Clippers signed free agent power forward Antawn Jamison to a one-year deal worth the veteran minimum. Jamison only appeared in 22 games, and was eventually traded to the Atlanta Hawks on February 20, 2014, in exchange for the draft rights to Cenk Akyol. On December 19, 2013, the Clippers signed free agent small forward Stephen Jackson. Jackson also appeared sporadically, and was eventually waived on January 7, 2014. On January 16, the Clippers signed free agent small forward Hedo Türkoğlu, while also acquiring both Glen Davis and Danny Granger for the remainder of 2013–14 season. On March 6, the Clippers defeated their crosstown rivals by 48 points 142–94, the most lopsided victory ever for the Clippers' franchise, and the most one-sided loss in Lakers history. On April 15, the Clippers broke the franchise record of wins with 57. In the playoffs, they defeated the Warriors in seven games before falling again, this time to the Thunder, in six games in the second round.

Donald Sterling controversy
On April 25, 2014, entertainment news website TMZ released a taped conversation in which team owner Donald Sterling—who had a history of accusations of racist behavior against African Americans and Latinos dating back to the 1990s—reprimanded V. Stiviano (of African American and Mexican heritage, who had reportedly been dating Sterling while he was estranged from wife) for posting an Instagram photo featuring her, former Los Angeles Lakers point guard Magic Johnson, and another woman. Sterling stated that it bothered him that she had "broadcast that [she is] associating with black people", and that he did not want Stiviano to bring them to the team's games. The remarks in the tape caused public backlash (including condemnations from many players, with Johnson, Kareem Abdul-Jabbar, Charles Barkley, Shaquille O'Neal, LeBron James, and Kobe Bryant all voicing their disapproval); several sponsors also severed ties with the team, among them Kia Motors (for whom Griffin serves as its television spokesperson), State Farm Insurance, and Virgin America. Threats of boycotts against the Clippers were also considered, with the team itself briefly contemplating one at the April 27 playoff game against the Golden State Warriors (the fourth game in the team's first round playoff series). They opted to conduct a silent protest instead, by wearing their shirts inside-out, obscuring team logos.

On April 29, the NBA issued Sterling a lifetime ban from the organization after a league investigation into the recording confirmed that he was the one conversing with Stiviano. The league also issued a $2.5 million fine against Sterling (the highest allowable by the NBA) and barred him from attending games or practices involving any NBA team; being present in any Clippers office or facility; and from participating in any team business, player personnel decisions or league activity. NBA commissioner Adam Silver stated in a press conference regarding the decision that he will try to force Sterling to sell the Clippers, which would require the consent of three-quarters of the league's 29 other team owners. Silver later announced that the NBA would appoint a CEO to run the team. Before the ban was issued, Sterling told Fox News contributor Jim Gray that he had no plans to sell the team. The NBA installed former Citigroup and Time Warner chairman Richard Parsons as the interim CEO of the team on May 9, prior to allowing Steve Ballmer, a former CEO of Microsoft, to purchase the team for $2 billion. To buy the team, Ballmer reportedly beat out other candidates, including Eric Piatkowski and his group, Oprah Winfrey, Floyd Mayweather, Magic Johnson, as well as a group of crowdfunders. The team's sale price, which was four times the expected purchase-evaluated price, prompted speculation that Ballmer aimed to relocate the team to Seattle, his hometown. He had previously been a part of an ownership group that had unsuccessfully attempted to move the Sacramento Kings to that city, but later stated no intention to relocate the team.

On August 12, 2014, Ballmer officially took control of the team following an order by a California court that confirmed the sale from Shelly Sterling to Ballmer. As part of the deal, Shelly received the titles of "Owner Emeritus" and "Clippers' Number 1 Fan", as well as ten tickets in sections 101 or 111 for all Clippers games, two courtside tickets for all games in Los Angeles, six parking spots in Lot C for each game, 12 VIP passes that include access to the Lexus Club, Arena Club, or Chairman's Lounge and Media room or equivalent, for each Staples games, three championship rings following any Clippers title, and will run a charitable foundation. The deal also included a stipulation that Steve Ballmer would keep the Clippers in Los Angeles. On November 6, the team hired its first major female executive as former Auto Club Speedway president Gillian Zucker was hired as the Clippers' president of business operations. Zucker became one of two women to serve in an executive capacity in any of the four major professional sports leagues; the other being Jeanie Buss, president and part-owner of the crosstown Lakers.

2014–2017: Final seasons of Lob City
The Clippers' first regular season under Ballmer's co-ownership ended with a 56–26 record and the third seed in the Western Conference going into the 2015 playoffs. They met the defending NBA champion San Antonio Spurs, winning the series in the seventh game on a game-winning shot by Paul with one second left. In the next series against the second-seeded Houston Rockets, they took a 3–1 series lead that included 25 and 33-point wins in games three and four, respectively. However, Houston won the final three games to eliminate Los Angeles. In the off-season, the Clippers acquired Lance Stephenson, Wesley Johnson, and Paul Pierce while re-signing Austin Rivers. Griffin missed half of the season and the Clippers finished with the fourth playoff seed before being then eliminated in the first round of the 2016 playoffs by the fifth-seeded Portland Trail Blazers.

The Clippers finished the 2016–17 season with a 51–31 record, the team's fifth straight 50-win season, despite injuries to both Griffin and Paul during the regular season. The Clippers won their last seven games and earned the fourth playoff seed by defeating the Sacramento Kings in the final game of the season. The Clippers faced the Utah Jazz in the first round of the playoffs, but lost in seven games. Paul Pierce retired after the season.

2017–present: Rebuild
In preparation for a rebuild, the Clippers brought in two-time Executive Of The Year winner Jerry West to serve as their special consultant; West was the architect behind the dynasties of the 2000 to 2002 Los Angeles Lakers and mid to late 2010s Golden State Warriors, and had helped to establish the Memphis Grizzlies as a relevant playoff contender. On June 28, 2017, Chris Paul was sent to the Houston Rockets in a sign-and-trade in exchange for Lou Williams, Patrick Beverley, Montrezl Harrell, Sam Dekker, Darrun Hilliard, DeAndre Liggins, Kyle Wiltjer, a future first-round pick, and cash considerations. The team retained Griffin and acquired Italian wing Danilo Gallinari in a three-team trade with the Denver Nuggets and Atlanta Hawks. Due to injuries to Griffin and Gallinari and no serious depth on the roster, the team was struggling by the 2018 trade deadline and traded Griffin to the Detroit Pistons in exchange for Tobias Harris, Avery Bradley, Boban Marjanović, a protected first-round pick in 2018, and a second-round pick in 2019. With the added depth, they finished with a winning record of 42–40 but missed the playoffs for the first time since 2011.

In the 2018 NBA draft, the team were awarded the 12th and 13th overall picks, and selected Miles Bridges and Jerome Robinson, respectively. They then traded Bridges and two future second-round picks on draft night to Charlotte for Shai Gilgeous-Alexander. Austin Rivers was traded to the Washington Wizards in exchange for Marcin Gortat, while long-time Clipper DeAndre Jordan, who had been with the team since 2008, opted out of his contract and became a free agent. Despite the departure of Griffin and Jordan for the 2018–19 season, the Clippers clinched a playoff berth and finished the regular season with a 48–34 record. The team faced the defending two-time NBA champion Golden State Warriors in the first round, losing in six games.

In the 2019 off-season, Kawhi Leonard opted out of his final year on his contract with the Toronto Raptors to become one of the top free agents. Leonard chose to sign with the Clippers when the team agreed to trade for the Oklahoma City Thunder's Paul George. For George, the Clippers traded Shai Gilgeous-Alexander, Danilo Gallinari, four unprotected first-round picks, a protected first-round pick, and two pick swaps.

Following the suspension of the 2019–20 NBA season, the Clippers were one of the 22 teams invited to the NBA Bubble to participate in the final 8 games of the regular season. They finished the year with a 49–23 record as the Western Conferences second seed. Despite high expectations, the Clippers failed to win their first conference semifinals series when they were eliminated by the Denver Nuggets in seven games. The defeat marked the second time that the Clippers lost the conference semifinals after taking a 3–1 series lead. A week later, Ballmer announced that Rivers stepped down as head coach in a mutual decision. Rivers was succeeded by Tyronn Lue.

Despite losing Leonard to injury during the 2021 playoffs, the Clippers defeated the top-seeded Utah Jazz in the semifinals, leading them to their first Western Conference Finals appearance in franchise history. The Clippers lost the conference finals in six games to the Phoenix Suns, preventing them from reaching their first NBA Finals.

Rivalries

Los Angeles Lakers

The rivalry between the Clippers and the Los Angeles Lakers is unique because they are the only two NBA teams to share an arena, the Crypto.com Arena. It is also one of only two intra-city rivalries in the NBA, the other being the crosstown rivalry between the New York Knicks and Brooklyn Nets.

Los Angeles fans have historically favored the Lakers. Some contend that the term rivalry was inaccurate until the Clippers became more successful during the 2010s.

Season-by-season record
List of the last five seasons completed by the Clippers. For the full season-by-season history, see List of Los Angeles Clippers seasons.

Note: GP = Games played, W = Wins, L = Losses, W–L% = Winning percentage

Home arenas
 Buffalo Memorial Auditorium (1970–1978)
 Maple Leaf Gardens (occasional games, 1971–1975)
 San Diego Sports Arena (1978–1984)
 Los Angeles Memorial Sports Arena (1984–1999)
 Arrowhead Pond of Anaheim (occasional games, 1994–1999)
 Crypto.com Arena (1999–present)
 Intuit Dome (planned to open in 2024)

Move to Intuit Dome
On June 15, 2017, the Clippers and the city of Inglewood entered into an exclusive negotiating agreement in which the team plans to build a new privately funded 18,000 to 20,000-seat arena, Inglewood Basketball and Entertainment Center, planning to open by 2024, when the Clippers' current lease with Crypto.com Arena expires. The planned arena is expected to be located at Century Boulevard between Yukon and Prairie Avenues, directly south of the new SoFi Stadium, the home of the Los Angeles Rams and Los Angeles Chargers of the National Football League. The arena is also expected to house a practice facility and team headquarters for the Clippers, as the team's current practice facility in Los Angeles' Playa Vista neighborhood is still owned by the Sterling Family Trust, and is leased back to the team. The Inglewood city council unanimously voted for the agreement in which a subsidiary of the Clippers will purchase 22 acres covering four large city blocks in what is largely a lower-class/lower-middle-class residential neighborhood (Century to the north, 104th Street to the south, Doty to the east, and Prairie to the west) to build the new facility.

The planned arena was met with immediate opposition from the nearby Forum and its operator, the Madison Square Garden Company (parent company of the New York Knicks), as they accused both the Clippers and the Inglewood city government of "backroom dealing" and the fear that a new Clippers' arena would siphon events from the recently renovated sports arena-turned-concert venue. In March 2020, Steve Ballmer, owner of the Clippers, reached an agreement with the Madison Square Garden Company to buy The Forum, eliminating any opposition related to the construction of the Clippers' new arena.

On July 25, 2019, the Clippers released images of the proposed arena with the construction planned to begin in 2021 and completed in fall 2024 following the expiration of the Clippers' lease with the Staples Center. On September 17, 2021, the Clippers unveiled the first renditions of the new arena with an expected cost of up to $2 billion. The team also revealed the arena's name as the Intuit Dome through a 23-year naming rights deal with Intuit worth $500 million.

Logos and uniforms

When the Braves franchise moved to San Diego and renamed the Clippers, they retained the baby blue base on their uniforms, but replaced black with orange trim. A series of nautical flags which spelled "Clippers" adorned each side of the shorts. The team's original logo featured a large baby blue circle enclosing a small orange circle to represent Southern California's sunny climate and three white sails to represent a clipper.
 
In a foreshadowing move, the Clippers redesigned their logo and uniforms for the 1983–84 season. This set, which the team carried over upon moving to Los Angeles the following season, replaced baby blue and orange with royal blue and red. The uniforms featured a royal blue base and red trim and were emblazoned with the team name in front; the "C" in the word "Clippers" was enlarged in the same manner as the logo. The Clippers also wore red uniforms on a number of occasions in 1984. The logo was now a generic moving white basketball with red lines superimposed over the full team name, which the team used until 2015, albeit with some tweaks to the design.

In 1987, the Clippers uniforms changed to a set that remained mostly intact until 2010. Red became the base color while blue was relegated to trim color. On the home white uniform, the team name was written in script lettering, while on the road red uniform, the city name in script was used. Later on, the road uniforms replaced the city name with the team name, and blue numerals were replaced with white numerals. Before the 2000–01 season, the Clippers made slight changes to their uniform, adding the interlocking "LAC" logo on the neckline and gaining thicker contrasting stripes and bolder numerals. Later on, the Clippers unveiled a blue alternate uniform which spelled the city name in red with white trim.

In 2010, the Clippers changed their uniforms, adjusting the stripes and letters. The white uniforms featured the team name in blue and the numerals in red, while the red uniforms were emblazoned with the city name in white and numerals in blue. Later on, the Clippers added a blue alternate uniform and a sleeved baby blue alternate uniform; both designs featured the city name in white and numerals in red.

On June 18, 2015, the Los Angeles Clippers unveiled its new brand identity. The club's primary logo features a basketball in the shape of a compass, with the club's "LAC" monogram situated in the middle. Below that is the club's wordmark logo in black, with the two curved lines below the wordmark symbolizing the horizon of the ocean, which the club says it alludes to its nautical roots. The team also unveiled its new home and away uniforms, which kept the design template from the previous uniforms. The home white uniform features the club's wordmark logo in black across the front. The away red uniform features the club's "LAC" monogram across the right breast, with the player's jersey number across the left breast.

The Clippers introduced an alternate black uniform intended to celebrate downtown Los Angeles on November 6, 2015. The uniform keeps the design template from the previous uniform, and features the club's primary logo without the wordmark.

The Clippers unveiled their new Nike Association (white) and Icon (team color) uniform designs on August 11, 2017. The home and road designations were dropped, and the team replaced its seldom-used road red uniform with a new blue "Icon" uniform that resembles the white "Association" uniform, which dropped the black accents. The black alternate (a.k.a. Statement uniform) was also retained. All three sets featured updated numeral and letter fonts.

A fourth uniform option, the City uniform, was later unveiled. For the 2017–18 season, the Clippers brought back the classic San Diego baby blue and orange scheme for their first City uniform, including the nautical flags which spell the acronym "LAC". The next season, the Clippers wore navy blue City uniforms to commemorate the team's 35th season in Los Angeles, as well as to pay tribute to the 1984 Summer Olympics. In the 2019–20 season, the Clippers donned white City uniforms with black letters and "Los Angeles" in Old English font as a tribute to Los Angeles' street culture. The Clippers kept most of the same design for the 2020–21 "City" uniform, this time with a black base. The 2021–22 "City" uniform saw the Clippers incorporate various uniform styles from the past, including the baby blue and orange of the Buffalo/San Diego era, the "Clippers" script from 1987 to 2015, and the three sails motif from the 2017–18 "City" uniform.

In the 2022–23 season, the Clippers wore black "City" uniforms as homage to the Drew League, a summer tournament in Los Angeles that celebrated its 50th anniversary in 2023. The white "Los Angeles" script was surrounded by a mosaic inspired by the Watts Towers.

After reaching the 2020 NBA playoffs, the Clippers were rewarded with an "Earned" uniform for the 2020–21 season. The uniform essentially recreated the team's "Icon" uniform, but had a grey base with thick white stripes, and red and blue were relegated to the arm piping.

In the 2022–23 season, the Clippers updated their black "Statement" uniforms, replacing the "LAC" logo with the "Los Angeles" script first used in their 2019–20 and 2020–21 "City" uniforms. The three sails motif from the 2017–18 and 2021–22 "City" uniforms was also added.

Coaches and players of note

All-time roster

Current roster

Retained draft rights
The Clippers hold the draft rights to the following unsigned draft picks who have been playing outside the NBA. A drafted player, either an international draftee or a college draftee who is not signed by the team that drafted him, is allowed to sign with any non-NBA teams. In this case, the team retains the player's draft rights in the NBA until one year after the player's contract with the non-NBA team ends. This list includes draft rights that were acquired from trades with other teams.

Retired numbers
The NBA retired Bill Russell's No. 6 for all its member teams on August 11, 2022.

Basketball Hall of Famers

Franchise leaders
Bold denotes still active with team.
Italic denotes still active but not with team.

Regular season (as of the end of the 2021–22 season)

Points

 Randy Smith (12,735)
 Blake Griffin (10,863)
 Bob McAdoo (9,434)
 Elton Brand (9,174)
 Corey Maggette (8,835)
 Chris Paul (7,674)
 Danny Manning (7,120)
 DeAndre Jordan (7,078)
 Loy Vaught (6,614)
 Ken Norman (6,432)
 Ron Harper (5,853)
 Chris Kaman (5,813)
 Jamal Crawford (5,675)
 Benoit Benjamin (5,405)
 Eric Piatkowski (5,269)
 Charles Smith (4,994)
 Lou Williams (4,975)
 Bob Kauffman (4,847)
 Swen Nater (4,694)
 Freeman Williams (4,467)
 World B. Free (4,299)
 JJ Redick (4,208)
 Lamond Murray (4,173)
 Norm Nixon (4,127)
 Michael Brooks (4,010)
 Lamar Odom (3,986)
 Gary Grant (3,899)
 Jim McMillian (3,585)
 Eric Gordon (3,544)
 Terry Cummings (3,514)

Single-season records

Individual awards

NBA Rookie of the Year
Terry Cummings – 1983
Blake Griffin – 2011

NBA Most Improved Player
Bobby Simmons – 2005

NBA Sixth Man of the Year
Jamal Crawford – 2014, 2016
Lou Williams – 2018, 2019
Montrezl Harrell – 2020

NBA Sportsmanship Award
Elton Brand – 2006

NBA Teammate of the Year
Chauncey Billups – 2013

NBA Executive of the Year
Elgin Baylor – 2006

All-NBA First Team
Chris Paul – 2012–2014
DeAndre Jordan – 2016
Kawhi Leonard – 2021

All-NBA Second Team
Elton Brand – 2006
Blake Griffin – 2012–2014
Chris Paul – 2015, 2016
Kawhi Leonard – 2020

All-NBA Third Team
Dominique Wilkins – 1994
Blake Griffin – 2015
DeAndre Jordan – 2015, 2017
Paul George – 2021

NBA All-Defensive First Team
Chris Paul – 2012–2017
DeAndre Jordan – 2015, 2016

NBA All-Defensive Second Team
Patrick Beverley – 2020
Kawhi Leonard – 2020, 2021

NBA All-Rookie First Team
Terry Cummings – 1983
Charles Smith – 1989
Lamar Odom – 2000
Darius Miles – 2001
Al Thornton – 2008
Blake Griffin – 2011

NBA All-Rookie Second Team
Brent Barry – 1996
Maurice Taylor – 1998
Michael Olowokandi – 1999
Eric Gordon – 2009
Eric Bledsoe – 2011
Shai Gilgeous-Alexander – 2019
Landry Shamet – 2019

NBA All-Star Weekend
NBA All-Star selections
Norm Nixon – 1985
Marques Johnson – 1986
Danny Manning – 1993, 1994
Elton Brand – 2002, 2006
Chris Kaman – 2010
Blake Griffin – 2011–2015
Chris Paul – 2012–2016
DeAndre Jordan – 2017
Paul George - 2021
Kawhi Leonard – 2020–2021

NBA All-Star Game Most Valuable Player
Randy Smith – 1978
Chris Paul – 2013
Kawhi Leonard – 2020

Slam Dunk champion
Brent Barry – 1996
Blake Griffin – 2011

Head coaches

ClipperVision
In 2022, the Clippers launched their own direct-to-consumer streaming service for non-national Clippers games. The service includes the regular game feed, along with CourtVision, which features analytics overlaid on the regular broadcast, BallerVision, an alternate viewing option for all games featuring Steve Ballmer and NBA legends, and Spanish and Korean broadcasts. The service also includes access to on-demand games. The service is available on Roku, iOS, Android, Apple TV and personal computers.

Commentators and broadcast outlets

Brian Sieman (television and radio play-by-play)
Jim Jackson (television and radio color commentator)
Kristina Pink (television sideline reporter)
 Noah Eagle (radio play-by-play and courtside reporter, TV play-by-play fill-in)
Mike Fratello (pregame and postgame analyst for telecasts on Bally Sports SoCal, TV commentary fill-in)
Corey Maggette (pregame and postgame analyst for telecasts on Bally Sports SoCal, TV commentary fill-in)
 Adam Ausland'' (pregame and postgame host for the KLAC/Clippers Radio Network)
 Broadcast television: KTLA
 Cable television: Bally Sports SoCal
 Radio: KLAC (570 AM); KWKW (1330 AM; Spanish); any Clippers game which conflicts with a Los Angeles Dodgers game on KLAC will be heard instead on KEIB (1150 AM)

Notes and references

Notes

References

Further reading

External links

 

 
National Basketball Association teams
Clippers
Basketball teams established in 1970
1970 establishments in New York (state)
Relocated National Basketball Association teams